Ryan Westley (born 19 August 1993) is a British slalom canoeist who has competed at the international level since 2009.

He won four medals at the World Championships with two silvers (C1: 2018, C1 team: 2017) and two bronzes (C1: 2015, C1 team: 2018). He also won one gold and two bronze medals at the European Championships.

World Cup individual podiums

References

External links

1993 births
English male canoeists
Living people
Sportspeople from Exeter
Medalists at the ICF Canoe Slalom World Championships